Harul is a traditional Indian folk dance performed in the Jaunsar-Bawar  and bordering regions of Himachal Pradesh. 
Both men and women can take part. In this dance, participants hold on to each other forming a long line and perform the traditional harul steps. The end positions are usually occupied by the men who hold up a single-handed. This dance is performed in a cheerful mood. Each harul song is in a narrative format between a man and a woman. The participants may also organize themselves into circle with the outer circle formed by men and the inner one by the women. Basic steps consist of criss-crossing the legs while moving accompanied by occasional knee bending, in sync with the rhythm. Participants wear colourful clothes.

References

Folk dance
Indian folk dances